This is a chronology of the Moro conflict, an ongoing armed conflict in the southern Philippines between jihadist groups such as the Abu Sayyaf Group, the Maute Group, Jemaah Islamiyah, and Islamic State affiliates, mainstream separatist groups such as the Moro Islamic Liberation Front (MILF), the Moro National Liberation Front (MNLF) and the Bangsamoro Islamic Freedom Fighters (BIFF), and the Philippine Government since 1971. Much of the fighting has been concentrated on the island of Mindanao and the Sulu archipelago, with spillover incidents and attacks occurring in the Philippine capital Manila and neighboring countries such as Malaysia.

Timeline of the conflict

1972 

 21 October –  The Moro National Liberation Front was founded by Nur Misuari as a splinter group from the Muslim Independence Movement.

2000
 30 January – A MILF attack on government troops in Carmen, Cotabato ended in a gunbattle with 7 MILF members killed and 3 soldiers wounded.
 17 March – A MILF brigade led by a Abdullah Macapaar (Commander Bravo) reportedly held the siege of the municipal hall of Kauswagan, Lanao del Norte.
 2 April – Five MILF rebels and a soldier were killed in a clash in Matungao, Lanao del Norte.
 7 May – Eleven soldiers from the 32nd Special Forces of the Armed Forces of the Philippines (AFP) were slain in an ambush by the ASG in Lantawan, Basilan.
 16 July – A bomb explosion by suspected MILF rebels at a market in Kabacan, Cotabato killed 4 people and wounded more than 30 others.
 16 September – Military offensive against the ASG began; 19 captives were later rescued; by mid-December, 205 ASG guerrillas and 12 from the military had been reportedly killed.
 Early November – Government troops seized a hideout of the extremists in Talipao, Sulu, with several rebels killed in the assault.
 10 November:
 Combined government forces prevented an attempt by MILF rebels to take over the town proper of Upi, Maguindanao and to kidnap Chinese residents; a gunbattle left 3 rebels dead.
 A clash in Tuburan, Basilan between the militiamen and MILF rebels, who had reinforced the armed followers of a village chief, killed 2 MILF rebels and a militiaman.
 Four ASG rebels were slain, as well as a soldier, in a clash between government forces and about 60 rebels in Talipao, Sulu.
 11 November – MILF rebels attacked two buses while passing on the road in Pikit, Cotabato, killing a passenger and wounding 16 others.
 23 November – Soldiers pursuing two groups of ASG fighters clashed with more than 80 guerillas in the jungle near Mt. Danao in Talipao, Sulu. Officials claimed an unknown number of rebels were slain.
 17 December – The 12th Scout Ranger Company of the Philippine Army attacked an ASG hideout in Patikul, Sulu and fought against some 140 rebels; 7 ASG members, as well as a soldier, were killed.
 18 December – Two MILF guerrillas were killed in a clash with the 44th Infantry Battalion in Sirawai, Zamboanga del Norte.

2010

2011

2012

 23 January – 193 MNLF combatants led by Hadji Obin Talab, Sharif Ahmad and Alawi Hajan allegedly defected to the MILF following a meeting in Barangay Marsada, Panglima Estino, Sulu. Ustad Habir Malik, operating in Luuk, Sulu, formerly led the MNLF defectors.

2013

2014

2015

2016

 6 December – A soldier was killed while a policeman was wounded in separate clashes between government forces and suspected members of the Maute group in Butig, Lanao del Sur.
 10 December – Three members of Abu Sayyaf, including a leader, were killed in a shooting between the police and the militants in Malaysia.
 20 December – Four fishing boat crew were reportedly abducted off Sulu.
 24 December – At least sixteen people, including a police officer, were injured in a blast outside a Catholic church in Midsayap, Cotabato.
 28 December – Two bombs injured thirty-three people who were attending an amateur boxing match in the town of Hilongos, Leyte in the Visayas, well beyond the conflict zone in Mindanao. Authorities believe that the BIFF or the Maute group are responsible.
 29 December – A bomb exploded on a highway in Aleosan, Cotabato, wounding six people.
 31 December – An improvised explosive device exploded outside the municipal gymnasium of Sultan Sumagka, Maguindanao where a gathering for peace and unity was held on New Year's Eve, no one is injured.

2017

 4 January – 2017 Kidapawan jail siege: Around 100 gunmen attack the North Cotabato District Jail in Kidapawan City. A total of 158 inmates escape, fourteen of whom are quickly recaptured, while five others are killed.
 29 January – Two children were killed and three others were injured when a bomb went off in Al-Barka, Basilan.
 15 February – Eight passengers were wounded when suspected Abu Sayyaf gunmen shot at a bus on the outskirts of Zamboanga City.
 27 February – a German sailor is beheaded by the Abu Sayyaf after being taken hostage since November 5, 2016.
 16 March – A Vietnamese seafarer who was kidnapped on 19 February by the Abu Sayyaf is killed while trying to escape.
 31 March – An improvised explosive device explodes in Midsayap, Cotabato before dawn  wounding a pedicab driver and a minor.
 11 April – 2017 Bohol clashes: The Abu Sauyaf Group launches an amphibious incursion into the province of Bohol in the Visayas, trigering a massive government operation that leaves 17 people dead.
 13 July – The bullet-riddled body of Vietnamese national Tran Viet Van was re-covered in Barangay Buhanginan in Patikul, Sulu after being held hostage by the Abu Sayyaf.
 28 July – Nine soldiers were injured when suspected militants set off an improvised explosive device (IED) in Rajah Buayan, Maguindanao.
 18 August – Five fighters from the Moro Islamic Liberation Front (MILF) die in a clash with BIFF militants.
 21 August – Nine people are killed, while sixteen others are wounded after Abu Sayyaf bandits attack a village in Maluso, Basilan.
 16 October – The leader of the Abu Sayyaf Group, Isnilon Hapilon is killed by the Philippine Army, along with the co-founder of the Maute group Omar Maute in Marawi, Lanao del Sur.
 23 October – The five-month-long siege in Marawi ended with the Philippine Government declaring victory.
 24 October – The Maute group is declared "practically wiped out" by the Armed Forces of the Philippines following the deaths of the seven Maute brothers.
 15 December – Remnants of the Maute group reportedly are recruiting new members around Marawi. The successor group has been labeled as the "Turaifie group" after its purported leader, Abu Turaifie.
 31 December –
 Two people were killed and sixteen others were injured when an improvised bomb went off along the national highway in Tacurong, Sultan Kudarat.
A policeman is killed while five others are injured when a bomb explodes as a police vehicle passes some 400 meters from the provincial headquarters of the Philippine National Police in Shariff Aguak, Maguindanao.

2018
 1 January – Two soldiers from the 57th IB are injured when an improvised explosive device explodes near the provincial hospital in Shariff Aguak, Maguindanao.
 8 January – Five Bangsamoro Islamic Freedom Fighters and a soldier were killed in a five-hour attack in Datu Unsay, Maguindanao
 9 January – A soldier is killed while two civilians are injured when a suspected Islamic State-inspired group sets off two separate roadside bombs in Maguindanao 
 19 January – Two explosions rock Barangay Semba, Datu Odin Sinsuat, Maguindanao, believed to be the work of the Bangsamoro Islamic Freedom Fighters (BIFF). No one is hurt.
 25 January – Two civilians are killed while another is injured in an improvised bomb explosion in a ricefield in Datu Piang, Maguindanao.
 1 February – Two people are killed while four others are wounded when Abu Sayyaf bandits attack a private vehicle in Patikul, Sulu.
 14 February – Members of the Abu Sayyaf Group abduct a government engineer in Jolo, Sulu.
 18 February – Five soldiers, including a junior officer, are injured in a roadside bombing in Datu Unsay, Maguidanao.
 29 April – Abu Sayyaf extremists kidnapp four people, including two policewomen in Patikul, Sulu.
 7 May – Three Abu Sayyaf terrorists are killed and seven soldiers wounded in an encounter in Patikul, Sulu.
 13–14 May – Eleven Abu Sayyaf terrorists and three soldiers are killed and 17 others injured in several shootouts in Patikul, Sulu.
 16 June – A woman believed to be pregnant was killed while a 14-year-old boy was injured by mortar fire from members of the BIFF in General Salipada K. Pendatun, Maguindanao.
 30 June – Militants of the BIFF detonate two bombs that rock the Barangay Hall of Timbangan, Shariff Aguak, Maguindanao. No one is injured in the incident.
 1–4 July – Eight more members of the BIFF are killed in a series of clashes in Maguindanao.
 31 July – A bomb exploded in a van and killed a suspected bomber, a soldier, four paramilitaries and four civilians, including a mother and her child, at a military checkpoint in Lamitan, Basilan. Twelve others are wounded.
 28 August – Two civilians are killed and thirty-six injured by a homemade bomb during a street festival in Isulan, Sultan Kudarat.
 2 September – 2018 Isulan bombings: A bomb blast in an internet cafe in Isulan, Sultan Kudarat kills 1 and injures 15. The attack is blamed on the Bangsamoro Islamic Freedom Fighters.
 14 September – Clashes with the Abu Sayyaf in Patikul, Sulu result in 17 wounded from the military, while 7 Abu Sayyaf militants are killed and 6 wounded.
 16 September – Eight people are injured including  a six-year-old girl, when a bomb went off in front of a pharmacy in General Santos. The police blame the pro-ISIS faction of the Bangsamoro Islamic Freedom Fighters for the bombing.

2019

2020

2021

8 May - Datu Paglas market occupation

2023
 5 February – Seven men allegedly linked to the Abu Sayyaf were killed in a pre-dawn encounter with government forces in Parang, Sulu near the boundary with Maimbung. Two companions were arrested; three were wounded.

References

Moro conflict
Timelines of current events
Moro conflict